Matthew or Matt Cooper may refer to:

 Matt Cooper, keyboardist of the British acid jazz band Incognito
 Matt Cooper (Irish journalist) (born 1966), Irish journalist, broadcaster, author and former editor of the Sunday Tribune
 Matt Cooper (rugby league) (born 1979), Australian rugby league footballer
 Matthew Cooper, American ambient recording artist better known as Eluvium
 Matthew Cooper (American journalist) (born 1963), American journalist; associated with the leaking of CIA officer Valerie Plame's name
 Matthew Cooper (footballer) (born 1994), Scottish footballer
 Matthew Cooper (rower) (1948–2015), British Olympic rower
 Matthew Cooper (rugby union) (born 1966), New Zealand rugby union footballer
 Matthew T. Cooper (born 1934), United States Marine Corps general

Characters
 Matthew Cooper, a fictional character from the video game ArmA II (2009)
 Matthew Cooper, a fictional character from the television series Dr. Quinn, Medicine Woman (1993–1998)